M-Dubs was a UK garage production duo formed by Ras Kwame. Their 2000 single, "Bump 'n' Grind (I Am Feeling Hot Tonight)" featuring Lady Saw, reached No. 59 on the UK Singles Chart.

Discography

Singles
 "Over You" (1997)
 "I Got the Music (The UK Mixes)" (1997) (with The 49ers)
 "Destiny" (1998) (with Club Hi-Life featuring Ann-Marie Smith of the 49ers)
 "Over Here" (1998) (featuring The Emperor Richie Dan) - UK No. 84
 "For Real" (1999)
 "Bump 'n' Grind (I Am Feeling Hot Tonight)" (1999/2000) (featuring Lady Saw) - UK No. 59

References

English electronic music duos
Musical groups established in 1994
Musical groups disestablished in 2000
Male musical duos
UK garage duos
1994 establishments in England